Tolly Salvatory Augustine Mbwette (8 June 1956 – 2 July 2020) was a Tanzanian academic, engineer and educator. He held various positions in national and international institutions of higher learning over his lifetime, including that of vice chancellor of the Open University of Tanzania. He was a team leader for various multi-disciplinary research teams responsible for both drinking and wastewater treatment systems that rely on bio-systems. 

Mbwette also participated in a number of co-operation programmes between European and American institutions and African universities.

Education background
Mbwette obtained a Bachelor of Science degree in civil engineering from the University of Dar es Salaam in 1981 and a postgraduate diploma in sanitary engineering from the International Institute for Hydraulic and Environmental Engineering in the Netherlands the following year. He went on to obtain a Master of Engineering degree in Civil and Environmental studies from the University of Dar es Salaam in 1984 and a PhD in public health and Environmental studies from the Imperial College of Science and Technology in 1989.

Career
Mbwette held various managerial positions in institutions of higher learning, starting with a position as associate dean for research, publications and postgraduate studies in the Faculty of Engineering at the University of Dar es Salaam (UDSM), after which he assisted the UDSM vice chancellor in coordinating the university's Institutional Transformation Program for eight years between July, 1994 and July, 2002. 

From January 2004 to April 2005, he was deputy vice chancellor for academics at the Open University of Tanzania and went on to serve as vice chancellor of the university from 13 April 2005 to 12 April 2015. He was chairman of the Inter-University Council for East Africa's Governing Board for two years and served as its vice chairperson from 2008 to 2010. He was the founder and chairman of TERNET Council between 2007 and 2010. Between 2007 and 2009, Mbwette was the chairman of the Tanzania Commission for Universities. He served as vice chairperson of the Governing Board of the African Council of Distance Learning between 2008 and 2011. 

From 2009, he was an honorary advisor to the Commonwealth of Learning. In July, 2011 he was elected President of the African Council of Distance Learning for a period of three years. Mbwette has conducted extensive research and consultancy in the areas of environmental engineering, information and communications technology, institutional reforms and environmental management. He served as Governing Board member of the Association of African Universities. He was also a chairperson of the university council of Kampala International University in Uganda and served as board chairman of the Tanzania Telecommunications Corporation. 

In 2015, Mbwette opened a public library known as the Mbwette Professional Library which holds a collection of research and reading materials. The library is responsible for directly supporting the national and international research community.

Personal life
Mbwette died at Aga Khan Hospital in Dar es Salaam on 2 July 2020.

Selected works

See also

External links

References

1956 births
People from Mbeya Region
Tanzanian engineers
University of Dar es Salaam
Open University of Tanzania
Open University of Tanzania alumni
University of Dar es Salaam alumni
Alumni of Imperial College London
2020 deaths